The 2009 FIBA Asia Under-16 Championship was the qualifying tournament for FIBA Asia at the Under-17 World Championship 2010 at Hamburg, Germany. The tournament was held on Johor Bahru, Malaysia from November 19 to November 27.

Draw
The draw was held on October 26, 2009.

* Saudi Arabia withdrew from the tournament; Consequently, hosts Malaysia who were earlier drawn in Group C moved to Group D. But Saudi Arabia later decided to participate and replaced Myanmar in Group A.

Preliminary round

Group A

Group B

Group C

Group D

Quarterfinal round

Group I

Group II

Group III

Group IV

Classification 9th–16th

15th place

13th place

11th place

9th place

Classification 5th–8th

Semifinals

7th place

5th place

Final round

Semifinals

3rd place

Final

Final standing

Awards

References

External links
FIBA Asia
Official Website

FIBA Asia Under-16 Championship
2009–10 in Asian basketball
2009–10 in Malaysian basketball
International basketball competitions hosted by Malaysia